Frank Xavier Filan (December 7, 1905-July 23, 1952) was an Associated Press photographers and one of the winners of the 1944 Pulitzer Prize for Photography. He entered U.S. military service in 1929, and covered the pacific theater in WWII as a photographer.

Born in Brooklyn, New York, Filan began his career with the Los Angeles Times.

References

1905 births
1952 deaths
20th-century American photographers
Pulitzer Prize for Photography winners
Associated Press photographers